Juaneco y Su Combo is a Peruvian cumbia band formed in Pucallpa, Peru in 1966.

History
Juaneco y Su Combo was originally founded by the amateur saxophonist Juan Wong Paredes as Juaneco y su Conjunto. In 1969, Paredes handed over control of the band to his son, Juan Wong Popolizio, who subsequently renamed it "Juaneco y su Combo". During the early 1970's, the band's popularity peaked, and they became one of the most innovative Peruvian cumbia bands at the time and a pioneer in the jungle cumbia genre. The band's members performed in headgear made from parrot feathers and cotton tunics, similar to the Shipibo people of Peru. In 1977, five of the band's members died in a plane crash.

Discography
El Gran Cacique (Infopesa, 1972, 2018)
Masters of Chicha Vol. 1 (Barbès, 2008)
Legado: Colección Definitiva (Infopesa, 2019)

References

External links

Peruvian musical groups
Musical groups established in 1966
1966 establishments in Peru
Cumbia musical groups